Marwan al-Muasher (born 1956) is a Jordanian diplomat and politician who was Jordan's foreign minister from 2002 to 2004 and its deputy prime minister during 2004 and 2005. He currently serves as vice president for studies at the Carnegie Endowment for International Peace, where he oversees research on the Middle East. He was Jordan's first ambassador to Israel and former ambassador to the United States.

Education and early career
Muasher attended Purdue University in West Lafayette, Indiana, where he earned a Bachelor of Science degree in electrical engineering in 1977, a Master of Science degree in computer engineering in 1978, and a PhD, also in computer engineering, in 1981.

Muasher began his career working as a journalist for the Jordan Times, the only Jordanian newspaper in the English language. He then entered government service, working in communications in the Ministry of Planning, at the prime minister's office as press adviser, and as director of the Jordan Information Bureau in Washington, D.C.

Career

Jordanian politics
In 1995, following the 1994 Israel–Jordan peace treaty, Muasher became Jordan's first ambassador to Israel. Then, in 1996, he became minister of information and the government spokesperson. From 1997 to 2002, he served in Washington, D.C., again as ambassador to the United States, and helped negotiate the Jordan–U.S. Free Trade Agreement, the first free-trade agreement the United States signed with an Arab country.

He returned to Jordan in January 2002 to serve as foreign minister, where he played a central role in developing the Arab Peace Initiative and the Middle East roadmap. He served until October 2004, when he gained the post of deputy prime minister in a cabinet reshuffle under former Prime Minister Adnan Badran that sought to continue reform and shrink the bureaucracy. He served as the deputy prime minister until November 2005. In 2005 he developed the National Agenda, a long-term political, economic and social reform plan for Jordan. The making up of the plan involved 450 Jordanian stakeholders and experts giving solutions and deadlines to implement them. The National Agenda was never actually realized because, according to Muasher, it was thwarted by a group of political elites and bureaucrats, eager to keep a rentier-based state system, rather than one based on merit.  According to Sultan Sooud Al-Qassemi, al-Muasher, a Christian, was dropped from the post to please the Jordanian Muslim Brotherhood.

From 2006 to 2007, he was a member of the Jordanian Senate.

International policy making
From March 2007 to 2010, he served as senior vice president of external affairs at the World Bank.

He currently serves as vice president for studies at the Carnegie Endowment for International Peace, where he oversees research on the Middle East from Washington, D.C., and Beirut, Lebanon. In 2011 Muasher took seat in the advisory council of The Hague Institute for Global Justice.

Publications
He is the author of two books:

Awards
Recipient of awards, including Jordanian Independence Medal and the Order of the Star of Jordan.

References

External links
 Official Twitter account
 October 2013 interview with Jordan Business Magazine
 March 19, 2014 discussion with Thomas L. Friedman at the Carnegie Endowment for International Peace in Washington, D.C.
 

1956 births
Living people
Members of the Senate of Jordan
Ambassadors of Jordan to Israel
Ambassadors of Jordan to the United States
20th-century diplomats
Information ministers of Jordan
Foreign ministers of Jordan
Deputy prime ministers of Jordan
Prime ministry affairs ministers of Jordan
Eastern Orthodox Christians from Jordan
Jordanian Christians